The Northern Line (numbered T9, coloured red) is a commuter rail line operated by Sydney Trains in Sydney, New South Wales, Australia. It serves some of Sydney's Inner West and Northern suburbs. It was spun off from the old T1 North Shore, Northern & Western Line  as a separate line in April 2019, to distinguish and make it more easily identified from the other T1 services. It is also a reincarnation of the older Northern Line which was under operation until 2013.

History

Original incarnation (until 2013)
The traditional Northern Line was the suburban portion of the Main North railway line (Strathfield - Hornsby) which opened in 1886 and was electrified in 1926. When the Sydney Harbour Bridge was opened, it connected railway services from the Main North line and the City underground onto the North Shore line.

Passenger services used to operate as the Main North Line (same name as the physical railway line) and was colour coded red on railway maps. It operated all the way to Cowan, until the service was truncated to Berowra in January 1992. The service, along with the North Shore Line service (yellow), later also ran along the North Shore railway line towards the City via the Harbour Bridge, forming a continuous loop via Strathfield, Epping and back to Hornsby.

In later years, the line operated as the Northern Line and ran from Hornsby to North Sydney via Strathfield and the City, with the North Shore line replacing services between Hornsby and Berowra. In February 2009, the Epping to Chatswood rail link was opened. In October 2009, the Northern Line service was integrated with the shuttle service between Epping and Chatswood. As a result, the traditional Northern Line was split in two, with trains from north of Epping operating via the new link, approaching the city via the North Shore Line and rejoining the traditional route before terminating at Epping.

Part of T1 (2013 to 2019)
In October 2013, the Northern Line, North Shore Line and Western line were merged to form the T1 North Shore, Northern & Western Line, which was colour coded yellow.

On weekdays, trains from the upper Northern Line (Hornsby via Macquarie University) joined up with the Western Line trains towards Richmond or Emu Plains, while trains from the lower Northern Line (Epping via Strathfield) joined up with the North Shore Line trains towards Hornsby or Berowra. On weekends, trains ran similar to prior to merger, where the lower Northern Line trains from Epping continue onto the upper Northern Line trains at Chatswood into Hornsby via Macquarie University.

In September 2018, the Epping to Chatswood line closed in order to be converted to metro standards as part of the Sydney Metro Northwest project. As a result, the traditional Northern line branch from Hornsby to Central via Strathfield was reinstated.

Reincarnation (since 2019)
On 28 April 2019, as part of the integration with the Sydney Metro Northwest, the Northern Line branch was spin-off from the T1 Line and became a separate T9 Northern Line, though using the same rolling stock. The new line runs from Hornsby to Hornsby or Berowra (loop) via Epping, Strathfield, Central, Chatswood and Gordon. Officially (published and used by the Sydney Trains network), the line "terminates" at Gordon, but most  services continue on the upper-North Shore, to Hornsby and Berowra. The separated line runs a similar route to the pre-2009 incarnation of the line. It is also similarly colour coded red.

Route
The line begins at Hornsby - a junction station with the North Shore Line. The line heads south to Strathfield via Epping using the Main North Line, crossing the Parramatta River between Rhodes and Meadowbank. At Strathfield, trains usually head onto a flyover over the 'Main lines', before heading east onto the Main Suburban Railway, usually using the middle 'Suburban' pair of the six tracks between Redfern and Strathfield. Trains pass through Redfern and Central, then through the western limb of the City Circle before heading across the Harbour Bridge. Then trains continue north along the North Shore before "terminating" at Gordon (although most services continue onto Hornsby). During the morning peak, trains travel in the following pattern:
 All stations from Hornsby to Epping, then all stations to Burwood except for Denistone, Concord West and North Strathfield, then terminating at Central.
 All stations from Epping to Strathfield, then Redfern, Central, and all stations to Gordon, then all stations to Hornsby. 
Trains travel in the same manner during the afternoon peak in the opposite direction.

Patronage
The following table shows the patronage of Sydney Trains network for the year ending 30 June 2022.

References

Further reading
 The Short North Singleton, C.C. Australian Railway Historical Society Bulletin, March to June 1965

External links
Sydney Trains Northern Line timetable Transport for NSW
 Neety's Train Page - information on suburban stations.
 New South Wales Railways - historical information on suburban stations.
 New South Wales Transport Information
 Australian Railmaps - information & maps of train services & stopping patterns.
 Transport Infrastructure Development Corporation project website

Sydney Trains